Mariya or Maria Prusakova may refer to:

 Maria Prusakova (politician)
 Mariya Prusakova (snowboarder)